Anne Carroll George (1927-2001) was an American author and poet. A collection of her poetry, Some of it is True (1993, Curbow Publications), was nominated for the Pulitzer Prize in 1993, and her Southern Sisters mystery series was honored with the coveted Agatha Award. She graduated from Samford University
and was Alabama's 1994 state poet and cofounder of Druid Press. George died in 2001 of complications during heart surgery.

Bibliography
 Dreamer, Dreaming Me (1980)
 Wild Goose Chase (1982)
 Spraying Under the Bed for Wolves (1985, Druid Press)
 Some of it is True (1993, Curbow Publications)
 This One and Magic Life: A Novel of a Southern Family (1999)
 The Map that Lies Between Us (2000, Black Belt Press)

Southern Sisters Mysteries
 Murder on A Girls' Night Out (1996)
 Murder on A Bad Hair Day (1996)
 Murder Runs in the Family (1997)
 Murder Makes Waves (1997)
 Murder Gets A Life (1998)
 Murder Shoots the Bull (1999)
 Murder Carries A Torch (2000)
 Murder Boogies with Elvis (2001)

References

External links
 Official Anne George Website
 Aunt Sister and The Mouse: an Anne George Fan Site
 FantasticFiction - Anne George

1927 births
2001 deaths
20th-century American novelists
20th-century American women writers
Agatha Award winners
American mystery writers
American women novelists
Writers from Montgomery, Alabama
Samford University alumni
Poets from Alabama
Women mystery writers
American women poets
21st-century American women writers
20th-century American poets
Novelists from Alabama